Jean-Baptiste Le Moyne de Bienville (February 23, 1680 – March 7, 1767), also known as Sieur de Bienville, was a French colonial administrator in New France. Born in Montreal, he was an early governor of French Louisiana, appointed four separate times during 1701–1743. He was the younger brother of explorer Pierre Le Moyne d'Iberville.

Early life
Jean-Baptiste Le Moyne was the son of Charles le Moyne, born in Longueil, near Dieppe, and Catherine Primot (also known as Catherine Thierry), born in Rouen, both cities in the Province of Normandy. Charles le Moyne established his family in the settlement of Ville-Marie (present day Montreal) at an early age and had fourteen children total.

Exploration in the New World
At the age of seventeen, Bienville joined his brother Iberville on an expedition to establish the colony of Louisiana. In 1699, the group explored the Gulf of Mexico coastline as far as Mobile Bay, which was too shallow to go further. At the site of Belle Fontaine, they discovered an artesian spring bubbling and leaping from the beach; this spring is now 300–400 feet out in Mobile Bay. Bienville played a significant role in charting the coast near Mobile, Alabama. He also discovered the Chandeleur Islands off the coast of Louisiana, as well as Cat Island and Ship Island off the Mississippi coast, before moving westward to sail up the mouth of the Mississippi River. Eventually, the expedition reached the modern-day site of Baton Rouge and False River. In April 1699, before heading back to France, Iberville established the first settlement of the Louisiana colony: Fort Maurepas or Old Biloxi, at present-day Ocean Springs, Mississippi. He appointed Sauvolle de la Villantry as the governor and made Bienville lieutenant.

Following Iberville's departure, Bienville took another expedition up the Mississippi River and encountered English ships at what is now known as English Turn. Upon hearing of this encounter on his return, Iberville ordered Bienville to establish a settlement along the Mississippi River at the first solid ground he could find. Fifty miles upriver, Bienville established Fort de la Boulaye.

Co-founder of Mobile
On the recommendations of his brother, Bienville moved the majority of the settlers to a new settlement in what is now Alabama on the west side of the Mobile River, called Fort Louis de la Mobile (or "Mobille"). He also established a deepwater port nearby on Dauphin Island for the colony, as Mobile Bay and the Mobile River were too shallow for seagoing vessels.

The population of the colony fluctuated over the next few years. In 1704, in part due to fear that fraternization of French soldiers with native females might lead to conflict, Bienville arranged for the arrival of twenty-four young French women. By tradition the young ladies were selected from convents, though most were likely from poor families. Because they traveled to the New World with their possessions in small trunks known as cassettes, they are known in local histories as the casquette girls in early accounts and by the English translation of casket girls in later tradition.

The young ladies were lodged in Bienville's home under the care of his housekeeper, a French-Canadian woman known as Madame Langlois. (By tradition she was a widowed cousin to Bienville and his brothers, but there is no confirmation of this.) Madame Langlois had learned from local native tribes the arts of cooking local produce and imparted this knowledge to her charges in what is generally heralded as the origin of Creole cuisine. The names and fates of most of the Casquette Girls is uncertain, but at least some remained in the colony and married French soldiers as intended, the first recorded birth of a white child occurring in 1705.

The population of the colony fluctuated over the next generation, growing to 281 by 1708, but diminishing to 178 two years later due to disease. In 1709, a great flood overflowed Fort Louis de la Mobile: because of this and the outbreaks of disease, Bienville ordered the settlement to move downriver to the present site of Mobile, Alabama in 1711 where another wooden Fort Louis was built. By 1712, when Antoine Crozat took over administration of Louisiana by royal appointment, the colony boasted a population of 400 persons. In 1713, a new governor arrived from France, and Bienville moved west where, in 1716, he established Fort Rosalie on the present site of Natchez, Mississippi. The new governor, Antoine Laumet de La Mothe, sieur de Cadillac, did not last long due to mismanagement and a lack of growth in the colony. He was recalled to France in 1716, and Bienville again took the helm as governor, serving the office for less than a year until the new governor, Jean-Michel de Lepinay, arrived from France. Lepinay's tenure was short lived, however, as Crozat had relinquished control of the colony and its administration to John Law and his Company of the Indies. In 1718, Bienville found himself once again governor of Louisiana, and it was during this term that Bienville established the city of New Orleans, Louisiana.

Father of New Orleans
Bienville wrote to the Directors of the Company in 1717 that he had discovered a crescent bend in the Mississippi River which he felt was safe from tidal surges and hurricanes and proposed that the new capital of the colony be built there. Permission was granted, and Bienville founded New Orleans in the spring of 1718 (May 7 has become the traditional date to mark the anniversary, but the actual day is unknown). By 1719, a sufficient number of huts and storage houses had been built that Bienville began moving supplies and troops from Mobile. Following disagreements with the chief engineer of the colony, Pierre Le Blond de La Tour, Bienville ordered an assistant engineer, Adrien de Pauger, to draw up plans for the new city in 1720. In 1721, Pauger drew up the eleven-by-seven block rectangle now known as the French Quarter or the Vieux Carré. After moving into his new home on the site of what is now the Custom House, Bienville named the new city "La Nouvelle-Orléans" in honor of Philippe II, Duke of Orléans, the Prince Regent of France.  New Orleans became the capital of French Louisiana by 1723, during Bienville's third term.

Father of Biloxi
In 1719, during the War of the Quadruple Alliance (1718–1720), Bienville had moved the capital of French Louisiana from Mobile near the battlefront with Spanish Pensacola back to Fort Maurepas (Old Biloxi).
However, due to shifting sand bars, the settlement was moved across Biloxi Bay to found New Biloxi (or Nouvelle-Biloxi or Bilocci), in 1719. After the move, Fort Maurepas was burned (in the French custom to avoid resettlement by enemy forces). Also during 1719, the under-construction New Orleans had been entirely flooded (6 inches or higher), with the realization that higher ground or levees would be needed for the inland port of that Crescent City. The governing council wanted to keep the capital on the Gulf of Mexico at Biloxi. However, the sandy soil around Biloxi complicated agriculture, and storms also shifted sands into Biloxi harbor, while the New Orleans site could be considered a deepwater port, closer to agricultural lands. Eventually, in June 1722, Bienville began moving the capital to New Orleans, completing the move in August 1722. The year 1723 was the first full year with New Orleans as capital of French Louisiana.

Chickasaw Indian War

In 1725, Bienville was recalled to France. He left the colony in the hands of Pierre Dugué de Boisbriant, succeeded by Étienne Perier. Bienville resumed his post in Louisiana in 1733. This last term in office would be one of conflict, as relations with the Chickasaw had deteriorated. Bienville immediately began planning for a two-pronged offensive. He ordered the Governor of the Illinois District Pierre d'Artaguette with all available force from that area to meet him in Chickasaw country to launch a coordinated attack. At the event, Bienville arrived late, so d'Artaguette attacked independently on March 25, 1736, and was crushed. After weeks of preparation, Bienville attacked from the south on May 26, and himself was bloodily repulsed. Humiliated, Bienville organized a second campaign and collected his forces at Chickasaw Bluff in 1739. The Chickasaws sued for peace, and a treaty was signed with Bienville in April 1740. After two campaigns falling so far short of expectations, Bienville requested that he be relieved of his duties as governor.

While waiting for a new governor to arrive, Bienville helped establish a Charity Hospital which had been endowed by a sailor named Jean Louis. He also headed a relief effort when two hurricanes hit the Gulf Coast in the fall of 1740. The new governor arrived in 1743, and Bienville sailed back to France. However, even in France, he did what he could to aid the colony he had worked so long to build, seeking unsuccessfully to prevent the transfer of the colony from France to Spain. Bienville died in Paris in 1767.

Legacy 

A  monument was erected in New Orleans to recognize Bienville's role as founder of the city by the Louisiana Purchase Sesquicentennial Commission. Cast in 1955 by Angela Gregory, the monument features Bienville atop a pedestal facing north. On the east face, to his right, sits a Native American. To his south, a priest. On the west side of the monument, Angela included the Le Moyne coat of arms.

Bienville is considered the Father of Louisiana.

Notes

References
 Bienville, Jean-Baptiste Le Moyne, Sieur de. "Account made by Bienville of his Expedition against the Chickasaws." trans. Caroline and Eleanor Dunn in Indiana's First War. Indiana Historical Society Publications 8. Indianapolis: Wm. B. Burford, 1924. 75-123.
 Davis, Edwin Adams. Louisiana the Pelican State. Baton Rouge: Louisiana State University Press, 1961. LCCN 59:9088.

External links

Bienville biography at University of South Alabama Archaeology website 
Bienville biography at the Library of Congress' France in America digital library (English and French)

 Jean Baptiste de Bienville Survey at The Historic New Orleans Collection

Bienville, Jean-Baptiste Le Moyne, Sieur de
Bienville, Jean-Baptiste Le Moyne, Sieur de
Canadian nobility (French)
Bienville, Jean-Baptiste Le Moyne, Sieur de
Persons of National Historic Significance (Canada)
French military personnel of the War of the Quadruple Alliance
Le Moyne family
Governors of Louisiana (New France)